Anna Costalunga (born 24 January 1970) is an Italian former basketball player. She competed in the women's tournament at the 1992 Summer Olympics.

References

External links
 

1970 births
Living people
Italian women's basketball players
Olympic basketball players of Italy
Basketball players at the 1992 Summer Olympics
Sportspeople from the Province of Vicenza
People from Schio